Jérôme Phojo (born 15 April 1993) is a French professional footballer who plays as a right-back. He is a former youth international for France, having earned caps at under-19 and under-20 level.

Career
Born in Poissy, Phojo is a former graduate of the prestigious Clairefontaine academy and, upon leaving, signed with Monaco. With Monaco, he was a member of the Monaco under-19 team that won the 2010–11 edition of the Coupe Gambardella.

He made his professional debut on 18 May 2012 in a league match against Boulogne. Following the season, Phojo signed his first professional contract agreeing to a three-year deal.

Career statistics

Club

Notes

References

External links
 
 
 
 
 

1993 births
Living people
Association football fullbacks
French footballers
AS Monaco FC players
CA Bastia players
AC Arlésien players
Clermont Foot players
Ligue 1 players
Ligue 2 players
France youth international footballers